Wētā FX, formerly known as Weta Digital, is a New Zealand-based digital visual effects company based in Miramar, Wellington. It was founded by Peter Jackson, Richard Taylor, and Jamie Selkirk in 1993 to produce the digital special effects for Heavenly Creatures. The company went on to produce some of the highest-grossing films ever made, such as the Lord of the Rings trilogy, Avatar, and Avatar: The Way of Water. Considered one of the most influential film companies of the 21st century, Wētā FX has won several Academy Awards and BAFTAs. The company is named after the New Zealand wētā, one of the world's largest insects, which was historically featured in the company logo.

History

The company was founded by Peter Jackson, Richard Taylor, and Jamie Selkirk in 1993 to produce the digital special effects for the film Heavenly Creatures. As of 2023, Wētā FX has won seven Academy Awards for Best Visual Effects: The Lord of the Rings: The Fellowship of the Ring (2001), The Lord of the Rings: The Two Towers (2002), The Lord of the Rings: The Return of the King (2003), King Kong (2005), Avatar (2009), The Jungle Book (2016), and Avatar: The Way of Water (2022).

The studio has developed several proprietary software packages to achieve groundbreaking visual effects. The scale of the battles required for The Lord of the Rings film trilogy led to the creation of MASSIVE, a program which can animate huge numbers of agents: independent characters acting according to pre-set rules.

To recreate 1933 New York for King Kong, the company created CityBot, an application which could "build" the city on a shot by shot basis. Kong's fur also required the development of new simulation and modeling software. A set of tools that combined procedural and interactive techniques added wind to the five million individual strands of fur and modeled interaction with other surfaces. New shaders were written that accounted for the scattering of light from within each hair that added to the volumetric quality of the fur. Large chunks of fur were ripped out and filled in with scars, blood, and the mud of Skull Island. Each frame of fur took two gigabytes of data.

For James Cameron's Avatar, Weta Digital modified MASSIVE to give life to the flora and fauna on Pandora, for which the company did most of the visual effects with Joe Letteri, under a team led by executive and producer Eileen Moran. The film is regarded as a landmark for visual effects. By 2017, Weta Digital had started visual effects development for the sequels. 

In 2010, a texture painting application developed by the studio for Avatar called Mari has been bought by The Foundry Visionmongers. For The Adventures of Tintin and Rise of the Planet of the Apes, the studio developed a new grooming system called Barbershop where users can interactively manipulate digital hair. This tool received a Sci-tech award in 2015. The Adventures of Tintin was Weta Digital’s first fully animated feature film.

For Rise of the Planet of the Apes in 2011, the company was able to develop their motion capture technique to be able to leave the studio for shooting on location. The motion capture technology would be improved in the 2014 sequel Dawn of the Planet of the Apes. This was further refined in War for the Planet of the Apes in 2017.

On June 19, 2020, Weta Digital announced that it would be producing original animation content under the name Weta Animated. The company also announced a new chief executive Prem Akkaraju, who comes from Los Angeles. In September 2020, Weta was able to secure a multi-year deal with Amazon Web Services to use the Amazon cloud to forward its VFX and animation production.

In December 2020, Weta Digital CEO Prem Akkaraju announced additional board members including Tom Staggs, Jeff Huber and Ken Kamins. They join current board members Peter Jackson, Fran Walsh, Sean Parker and Joe Letteri.

On June 17, 2021, Weta Digital announced they have partnered with Autodesk to productize Weta's proprietary tools based in Autodesk Maya for a cloud service called WetaM. It will first be released in Q4 as a private beta.

On August 23, 2021, Weta Digital announced a collaboration with SideFX for a cloud service combining the studio's proprietary tools within SideFX's Houdini called WetaH.

On November 9, 2021, Jackson sold the company's VFX tools development division to video games software company Unity Technologies for US$1.625 billion. Unity's acquired tech assets of Weta will be called Weta Digital, while the visual effects company remained separate and renamed as Wētā FX. The acquisition was completed in December 2021. In April 2022, Wētā FX opened a new studio in Vancouver. It is the company's first dedicated VFX studio outside New Zealand.

For Avatar: The Way of Water in 2022, Wētā worked on 3,240 visual effects shots, 2,225 of which involved water. The studio developed new performance capture technology for the film's underwater sequences. The digital water in the film was created by artists using Wētā's latest Loki simulation software. Wētā also refined their Facial Action Coding System (FACS) from Alita: Battle Angel for its use in Avatar: The Way of Water. The company eventually ended up rendering close to 3.3 billion thread hours. Letteri won his fifth Academy Award for his work on the film.

Workplace culture 
Beginning in June 2020, an investigative project by Kiwi public TV broadcaster 1 News into Wētā's workplace culture following a social media posting by former Wētā Workshop employee Layna Lazar later resulted in more than 40 current and former Weta Digital employees anonymously sharing accounts of "sexism, bullying and harassment" in September 2020.

In their testimonies, workers identified the existence of a male-only pornographic mailing list called "Caveman", which originated in 2002 following a company-wide tradition known as Porn Friday, and continued to circulate until 2015. Several reports also alleged that the company's IT systems required upgrades in order to accommodate the volume of pornographic content hosted on the company intranet, in addition to numerous allegations of sexual harassment, bullying, intimidation, misogyny and homophobia.

In response to these allegations, Wētā owners, including Peter Jackson, Fran Walsh, and chief executive officer Prem Akkaraju, commissioned an independent review from barrister Miriam Dean, who stated in her report that she received 80 complaints of bullying behavior, 120 complaints of inappropriate conduct and 19 complaints of sexual harassment from amongst the company's 1,500 employees. Dean put forward 17 recommendations for internal reform, including the establishment of a code of conduct, restricting the executive team, expanding the diversity and inclusion program, and reviewing the company's pay structure. Her review also stipulated that the existing management systems were not sufficient to protect workers "from bullying, sexual harassment, sex discrimination and other inappropriate conduct".

Films

1990s

2000s

2010s

2020s

Upcoming

Television

See also 
 Wētā Workshop
 Industrial Light & Magic
 Moving Picture Company (MPC)
 Animal Logic
 Blue Sky Studios
 Pacific Data Images
 Framestore
 Digital Domain
 DNEG
 Sony Pictures Imageworks
 Rhythm & Hues
 Image Engine
 Visual Works

References

External links
 
 Massive
 Official Facebook page

New Zealand animation studios
Film production companies of New Zealand
Visual effects companies
Wellington City
Companies based in Wellington
Mass media in Wellington
New Zealand companies established in 1993
2021 mergers and acquisitions
Mass media companies established in 1993